Sue Louise Sanders is Emeritus Professor Harvey Milk Institute 2015 (born in 1947 in London). She is,  an "out and proud" lesbian, a  British LGBT rights activist who has specialized in challenging oppression in the public and voluntary sectors for over forty years.

Career 
After studying at London's New College of Speech and Drama (now part of Middlesex University) where she received a teaching diploma, Sanders studied counseling on alcohol-related problems as well as gestalt therapy and contribution training. She also holds qualifications on dealing with stress and trauma.

Since 1967, she has been a teacher, tutor and a lecturer on women's studies, drama and homophobia in schools, universities and other organisations, both in London and in Sydney, Australia.

Since 1984, Sanders has worked as a management consultant and trainer for the public and voluntary sector. She was a member of the LGBT Advisory Group to the Metropolitan Police (since 1999), was an independent adviser to the London Criminal Justice Board, and is a member of the Hate Crime Independent Advisory Group for the Ministry of Justice, she was a member of the National Union of Teachers LGBT working party (since 1999),  a member of the  Southwark anti Homophobic Forum (which she joined in 1997) and was a consultant to the Crown Prosecution Services, helping them produce national policy on prosecuting homophobic crime effectively.

In 1996, she co-founded Chrysalis with Paul Patrick, a consultancy which delivered training around equal opportunity issues – particularly anti-heterosexism.

In 2000, she became the co-chair of Schools Out, a group working for the equality of LGBT people in the education system, which was started in 1974.(neither her nor Paul Patrick were there at the start)  With the help of the Schools Out committee, she and Paul Patrick instituted the UK's first  LGBT History Month; this was launched in  December 2004 at Tate Modern and then took place the following February. Then in 2011 she instigated The Classroom, a website with over 50 lesson plans free for teachers to 'Usualise' and 'Actualise' LGBT issues across the curriculum and in all key stages tied to the national curriculum. It has proved massively popular, uploaded by the TES and Guardian and now viewed by thousands both in this country and round the world

Sanders has directed many plays in London's fringe theatres and has been involved in the production of radio programmes for ABC in Sydney.

She is the author of poetry and short stories as well as many articles and brochures on feminist issues, education and homophobia. She regularly appears on TV and radio programmes dealing with equality and LGBT issues and is a keynote speaker and workshop leader in many conferences dealing with diversity, homophobia, and LGBT issues.

In 2018, she deposited her archive in the collections of the Bishopsgate Institute.

Awards
In 2019 Sue was awarded the lifetime achievement award from the rainbow honours board
In 2014 she was short-listed for the lifetime achievement award in the National Diversity Awards.
She regularly appears in the Independent LGBT Power list.
In 2012 she was awarded a Commendation from the Metropolitan Police service for her long-standing involvement and commitment to the MPS LGBT Advisory Group and her contribution to improving policing services for LGBT Londoners.
In 2007, Sanders received the Clio's Silver Cup Award from the International Lesbian and Gay Cultural Network for outstanding achievements in documenting and disseminating information about LGBT History.

In July 2009 she was awarded the first Derek Oyston Award in recognition of her lifetime's campaigning for LGBT rights at the celebration of the 30th anniversary of the Gay and Lesbian Humanist Association (GALHA) and the 40th anniversary of the Campaign for Homosexual Equality (CHE).
In 2002 she received the Crown Prosecution award for Equality and Diversity.

References

External links
 LGBT History Month
 Schools Out UK
 The Classroom
 Sue Sanders, Schools Out and LGBT History Month Archive, Bishopsgate Institute
 I was a lesbian teacher under Section 28 and it was absolutely frightening, Pink News - 24 May 2018
 Lesbian Activist Invited to Downing Street, UK Gay News - 14 July 2005
 Geeling murder shows 'school homophobia', Pinknews, 17 October 2006
  - 20 November 2006, TUC headquarters in London.
 Schools activist: bullying recommendations not good enough, Pinknews - 27 March 2007
 Half an Hour with Sue Sanders - podcast interview
 Gordon Brown hosts first LGBT reception, PinkNews - 6 March 2009

1947 births
Alumni of Middlesex University
English LGBT people
English LGBT rights activists
Living people